West Triplet Geyser is a geyser in the Upper Geyser Basin of Yellowstone National Park, Wyoming. Its activity is related to that of Grand and Rift geysers. Before 1947 it displayed regular activity, erupting about every three hours.

See also
List of Yellowstone geothermal features
Yellowstone National Park
Geothermal areas of Yellowstone

References

Geysers of Wyoming
Geothermal features of Teton County, Wyoming
Geothermal features of Yellowstone National Park
Geysers of Teton County, Wyoming